The 2009–10 Detroit Pistons season was the 69th season of the franchise, the 62nd in the National Basketball Association (NBA), and the 53rd in the Detroit area.

The Pistons missed the playoffs for the first time since the 2000–01 NBA season. The Pistons finished with their most disappointing record since 1994–95 when they finished 28–54. Prior to the season, Allen Iverson signed with the Memphis Grizzlies, citing his displeasure at being a bench player. However, he would leave the Grizzlies 2 months after signing with the team for the same reason.

Draft picks 

 Austin Daye
 DaJuan Summers
 Jonas Jerebko
 Chase Budinger

Roster

Regular season

Standings

Record vs. opponents

Game log 

|- bgcolor="#bbffbb"
| 1
| October 28
| @ Memphis
| 
| Richard Hamilton (25)
| Ben Wallace (9)
| Will Bynum (7)
| FedExForum17,212
| 1–0
|- bgcolor="#ffcccc"
| 2
| October 30
| Oklahoma City
| 
| Ben Gordon (25)
| Ben Wallace (12)
| Ben Gordon (4)
| The Palace of Auburn Hills22,076
| 1–1
|- bgcolor="#ffcccc"
| 3
| October 31
| @ Milwaukee
| 
| Ben Gordon (26)
| Ben Wallace (10)
| Rodney Stuckey (8)
| Bradley Center15,095
| 1–2

|- bgcolor="#bbffbb"
| 4
| November 3
| Orlando
| 
| Ben Gordon (23)
| Ben Wallace (10)
| Ben Gordon, Rodney Stuckey (3)
| The Palace of Auburn Hills15,487
| 2-2
|- bgcolor="#ffcccc"
| 5
| November 4
| @ Toronto
| 
| Ben Gordon (30)
| Rodney Stuckey (10)
| Will Bynum (6)
| Air Canada Centre17,915
| 2-3
|- bgcolor="#ffcccc"
| 6
| November 6
| @ Orlando
| 
| Charlie Villanueva (28)
| Jonas Jerebko (6)
| Ben Gordon (5)
| Amway Arena17,461
| 2-4
|- bgcolor="#bbffbb"
| 7
| November 8
| Philadelphia
| 
| Ben Gordon (23)
| Ben Wallace (16)
| Will Bynum (8)
| The Palace of Auburn Hills17,187
| 3-4
|- bgcolor="#bbffbb"
| 8
| November 11
| Charlotte
| 
| Charlie Villanueva (30)
| Ben Wallace (9)
| Ben Gordon (8)
| The Palace of Auburn Hills15,417
| 4-4
|- bgcolor="#bbffbb"
| 9
| November 14
| @ Washington
| 
| Ben Gordon (29)
| Rodney Stuckey (9)
| Will Bynum (6)
| Verizon Center20,173
| 5-4
|- bgcolor="#ffcccc"
| 10
| November 15
| Dallas
| 
| Rodney Stuckey (28)
| Charlie Villanueva, Ben Wallace (10)
| Will Bynum (3)
| The Palace of Auburn Hills18,215
| 5-5
|- bgcolor="#ffcccc"
| 11
| November 17
| @ LA Lakers
| 
| Will Bynum (24)
| Jason Maxiell (7)
| Will Bynum (6)
| Staples Center18,997
| 5-6
|- bgcolor="#ffcccc"
| 12
| November 18
| @ Portland
| 
| Rodney Stuckey (21)
| Ben Wallace (12)
| Rodney Stuckey (5)
| Rose Garden Arena20,391
| 5-7
|- bgcolor="#ffcccc"
| 13
| November 21
| @ Utah
| 
| Ben Gordon (25)
| Ben Wallace (9)
| Rodney Stuckey (6)
| EnergySolutions Arena18,355
| 5-8
|- bgcolor="#ffcccc"
| 14
| November 22
| @ Phoenix
| 
| DaJuan Summers, Charlie Villanueva (13)
| Jason Maxiell (7)
| Rodney Stuckey (5)
| US Airways Center18,422
| 5-9
|- bgcolor="#ffcccc"
| 15
| November 25
| Cleveland
| 
| Rodney Stuckey (25)
| Ben Wallace (9)
| Will Bynum (5)
| The Palace of Auburn Hills22,076
| 5-10
|- bgcolor="#ffcccc"
| 16
| November 27
| LA Clippers
| 
| Jonas Jerebko (22)
| Ben Wallace (16)
| Will Bynum (9)
| The Palace of Auburn Hills18,594
| 5-11
|- bgcolor="#bbffbb"
| 17
| November 29
| Atlanta
| 
| Rodney Stuckey (23)
| Ben Wallace (18)
| Rodney Stuckey (8)
| The Palace of Auburn Hills15,273
| 6-11

|-bgcolor="#ffcccc"
| 18
| December 2
| @ Chicago
| 
| Ben Gordon (18)
| Rodney Stuckey (9)
| Will Bynum (7)
| United Center21,523
| 6-12
|- bgcolor="#bbffbb"
| 19
| December 4
| Milwaukee
| 
| Rodney Stuckey (19)
| Ben Wallace (11)
| Rodney Stuckey (9)
| The Palace of Auburn Hills16,557
| 7-12
|- bgcolor="#bbffbb"
| 20
| December 6
| Washington
| 
| Rodney Stuckey (25)
| Jonas Jerebko (11)
| Charlie Villanueva, Ben Wallace, Chucky Atkins (5)
| The Palace of Auburn Hills14,123
| 8-12
|- bgcolor="#bbffbb"
| 21
| December 9
| @ Philadelphia
| 
| Rodney Stuckey (27)
| Ben Wallace (12)
| Rodney Stuckey (8)
| Wachovia Center12,136
| 9-12
|- bgcolor="#bbffbb"
| 22
| December 10
| Denver
| 
| Charlie Villanueva (27)
| Ben Wallace (16)
| Charlie Villanueva (5)
| The Palace of Auburn Hills17,176
| 10-12
|- bgcolor="#bbffbb"
| 23
| December 12
| Golden State
| 
| Rodney Stuckey (29)
| Charlie Villanueva, Ben Wallace (9)
| Rodney Stuckey (7)
| The Palace of Auburn Hills16,952
| 11-12
|- bgcolor="#ffcccc"
| 24
| December 15
| @ Houston
| 
| Richard Hamilton (21)
| Ben Wallace (8)
| Chucky Atkins (9)
| Toyota Center14,899
| 11-13
|- bgcolor="#ffcccc"
| 25
| December 16
| @ New Orleans
| 
| Rodney Stuckey (26)
| Charlie Villanueva (8)
| Will Bynum (9)
| New Orleans Arena13,196
| 11-14
|- bgcolor="#ffcccc"
| 26
| December 18
| @ Oklahoma City
| 
| Rodney Stuckey (31)
| Ben Wallace (8)
| Will Bynum (6)
| Ford Center17,774
| 11-15
|- bgcolor="#ffcccc"
| 27
| December 20
| L.A. Lakers
| 
| Rodney Stuckey (16)
| Ben Wallace (10)
| Chucky Atkins, Will Bynum (4)
| The Palace of Auburn Hills22,076
| 11-16
|- bgcolor="#ffcccc"
| 28
| December 22
| @ Charlotte
| 
| Rodney Stuckey (20)
| Ben Wallace (8)
| Will Bynum (4)
| Time Warner Cable Arena16,864
| 11-17
|- bgcolor="#ffcccc"
| 29
| December 23
| Toronto
| 
| Will Bynum (12)
| Ben Wallace (10)
| Will Bynum, Rodney Stuckey (3)
| The Palace of Auburn Hills19,396
| 11-18
|- bgcolor="#ffcccc"
| 30
| December 27
| @ Toronto
| 
| Richard Hamilton, Ben Gordon (15)
| Ben Wallace (9)
| Rodney Stuckey (5)
| Air Canada Centre19,800
| 11-19
|- bgcolor="#ffcccc"
| 31
| December 29
| New York
| 
| Ben Gordon (17)
| Rodney Stuckey, Ben Wallace (8)
| Rodney Stuckey (5)
| The Palace of Auburn Hills22,076
| 11-20
|-bgcolor="#ffcccc"
| 32
| December 31
| Chicago
| 
| Rodney Stuckey (22)
| Ben Wallace (9)
| Rodney Stuckey (6)
| The Palace of Auburn Hills22,076
| 11-21

|-bgcolor="#ffcccc"
| 33
| January 5
| @ Dallas
| 
| Richard Hamilton (20)
| Ben Wallace (12)
| Rodney Stuckey (6)
| American Airlines Center19,799
| 11-22
|-bgcolor="#ffcccc"
| 34
| January 6
| @ San Antonio
| 
| Richard Hamilton (29)
| Chris Wilcox (9)
| Tayshaun Prince (6)
| Conseco Fieldhouse17,337
| 11-23
|-bgcolor="#ffcccc"
| 35
| January 9
| Philadelphia
| 
| Ben Gordon (20)
| Austin Daye (7)
| Richard Hamilton (7)
| The Palace of Auburn Hills19,784
| 11-24
|-bgcolor="#ffcccc"
| 36
| January 11
| @ Chicago
| 
| Richard Hamilton (17)
| Jonas Jerebko (9)
| Rodney Stuckey (5)
| United Center21,014
| 11-25
|- bgcolor="#bbffbb"
| 37
| January 12
| @ Washington
| 
| Charlie Villanueva (23)
| Charlie Villanueva (9)
| Rodney Stuckey (11)
| Verizon Center13,544
| 12-25
|- bgcolor="#bbffbb"
| 38
| January 15
| New Orleans
| 
| Richard Hamilton (32)
| Ben Wallace (21)
| Richard Hamilton (10)
| The Palace of Auburn Hills17,446
| 13-25
|- bgcolor="#bbffbb"
| 39
| January 16
| New York
| 
| Rodney Stuckey (20)
| Charlie Villanueva, Chris Wilcox (10)
| Richard Hamilton (5)
| The Palace of Auburn Hills19,185
| 14-25
|-bgcolor="#ffcccc"
| 40
| January 18
| @ New York
| 
| Rodney Stuckey (22)
| Ben Wallace (17)
| Rodney Stuckey (4)
| Madison Square Garden19,302
| 14-26
|- bgcolor="#bbffbb"
| 41
| January 20
| Boston
| 
| Rodney Stuckey (27)
| Rodney Stuckey (11)
| Richard Hamilton (8)
| The Palace of Auburn Hills17,375
| 15-26
|-bgcolor="#ffcccc"
| 42
| January 22
| Indiana
| 
| Richard Hamilton (27)
| Jonas Jerebko (7)
| Rodney Stuckey (5)
| The Palace of Auburn Hills15,388
| 15-27
|-bgcolor="#ffcccc"
| 43
| January 23
| Portland
| 
| Richard Hamilton (25)
| Ben Wallace, Chris Wilcox (8)
| Richard Hamilton (9)
| The Palace of Auburn Hills19,114
| 15-28
|-bgcolor="#ffcccc"
| 44
| January 27
| Memphis
| 
| Rodney Stuckey (17)
| Ben Wallace (9)
| Rodney Stuckey (11)
| The Palace of Auburn Hills14,886
| 15-29
|-bgcolor="#ffcccc"
| 45
| January 29
| Miami
| 
| Charlie Villanueva (15)
| Richard Hamilton, Tayshaun Prince, Charlie Villanueva, Ben Wallace, Chris Wilcox (4)
| Richard Hamilton (5)
| The Palace of Auburn Hills20,669
| 15-30
|-bgcolor="#ffcccc"
| 46
| January 31
| Orlando
| 
| Rodney Stuckey (18)
| Jonas Jerebko, Tayshaun Prince, Ben Wallace (9)
| Rodney Stuckey (7)
| The Palace of Auburn Hills19,107
| 15-31

|- bgcolor="#bbffbb"
| 47
| February 2
| @ New Jersey
| 
| Richard Hamilton (22)
| Tayshaun Prince (8)
| Rodney Stuckey (9)
| Izod Center9,417
| 16-31
|-bgcolor="#ffcccc"
| 48
| February 5
| @ Indiana
| 
| Ben Gordon (26)
| Jonas Jerebko (10)
| Will Bynum (7)
| Conseco Fieldhouse14,832
| 16-32
|- bgcolor="#bbffbb"
| 49
| February 6
| New Jersey
| 
| Jonas Jerebko (20)
| Ben Wallace (10)
| Rodney Stuckey (11)
| The Palace of Auburn Hills20,176
| 17-32
|- bgcolor="#bbffbb"
| 50
| February 9
| @ Milwaukee
| 
| Ben Gordon, Tayshaun Prince, Rodney Stuckey (18)
| Jonas Jerebko (13)
| Rodney Stuckey (7)
| Bradley Center12,017
| 18-32
|-bgcolor="#ffcccc"
| 51
| February 10
| Sacramento
| 
| Tayshaun Prince (23)
| Ben Wallace (13)
| Rodney Stuckey (9)
| The Palace of Auburn Hills14,152
| 18-33
|- bgcolor="#bbffbb"
| 52
| February 16
| Minnesota
| 
| Jonas Jerebko (21)
| Jason Maxiell (10)
| Will Bynum (14)
| The Palace of Auburn Hills14,449
| 19-33
|-bgcolor="#ffcccc"
| 53
| February 17
| @ Orlando
| 
| Richard Hamilton (36)
| Tayshaun Prince (8)
| Rodney Stuckey (7)
| Amway Arena17,461
| 19-34
|-bgcolor="#ffcccc"
| 54
| February 19
| Milwaukee
| 
| Richard Hamilton (29)
| Ben Wallace (12)
| Tayshaun Prince (7)
| The Palace of Auburn Hills18,701
| 19-35
|- bgcolor="#bbffbb"
| 55
| February 21
| San Antonio
| 
| Richard Hamilton (27)
| Jonas Jerebko (10)
| Rodney Stuckey (6)
| The Palace of Auburn Hills20,153
| 20-35
|- bgcolor="#bbffbb"
| 56
| February 23
| @ Sacramento
| 
| Richard Hamilton (30)
| Rodney Stuckey (8)
| Rodney Stuckey (7)
| ARCO Arena11,557
| 21-35
|-bgcolor="#ffcccc"
| 57
| February 24
| @ LA Clippers
| 
| Richard Hamilton (21)
| Tayshaun Prince, Ben Wallace (10)
| Will Bynum, Tayshaun Prince, Rodney Stuckey (4)
| Staples Center16,095
| 21-36
|-bgcolor="#ffcccc"
| 58
| February 26
| @ Denver
| 
| Richard Hamilton (20)
| Ben Wallace (10)
| Rodney Stuckey (6)
| Pepsi Center19,845
| 21-37
|-bgcolor="#ffcccc"
| 59
| February 27
| @ Golden State
| 
| Tayshaun Prince (18)
| Ben Wallace (13)
| Tayshaun Prince (8)
| Oracle Arena17,223
| 21-38

|-bgcolor="#ffcccc"
| 60
| March 2
| Boston
| 
| Jonas Jerebko (16)
| Ben Wallace (12)
| Richard Hamilton (7)
| The Palace of Auburn Hills17,956
| 21-39
|-bgcolor="#ffcccc"
| 61
| March 3
| @ New York
| 
| Tayshaun Prince, Rodney Stuckey (16)
| Jonas Jerebko (13)
| Rodney Stuckey (6)
| Madison Square Garden19,341
| 21-40
|-bgcolor="#ffcccc"
| 62
| March 5
| @ Cleveland
| 
| Tayshaun Prince (23)
| Jonas Jerebko (12)
| Rodney Stuckey (10)
| Quicken Loans Arena20,562
| 21-41
|- bgcolor="#bbffbb"
| 63
| March 7
| Houston
| 
| Tayshaun Prince (29)
| Jason Maxiell (16)
| Will Bynum (11)
| The Palace of Auburn Hills18,422
| 22-41
|-bgcolor="#ffcccc"
| 64
| March 10
| Utah
| 
| Charlie Villanueva (19)
| Jason Maxiell (11)
| Richard Hamilton (7)
| The Palace of Auburn Hills16,908
| 22-42
|- bgcolor="#bbffbb"
| 65
| March 12
| Washington
| 
| Jonas Jerebko, Tayshaun Prince (18)
| Jason Maxiell (10)
| Will Bynum (20)
| The Palace of Auburn Hills20,273
| 23-42
|-bgcolor="#ffcccc"
| 66
| March 13
| @ Atlanta
| 
| Jason Maxiell (19)
| Jason Maxiell (12)
| Will Bynum (7)
| Philips Arena18,214
| 23-43
|-bgcolor="#ffcccc"
| 67
| March 15
| @ Boston
| 
| Will Bynum (16)
| Jason Maxiell (10)
| Will Bynum (6)
| TD Garden18,624
| 23-44
|-bgcolor="#ffcccc"
| 68
| March 16
| Cleveland
| 
| Richard Hamilton (24)
| Jason Maxiell (15)
| Tayshaun Prince (8)
| The Palace of Auburn Hills22,076
| 23-45
|-bgcolor="#ffcccc"
| 69
| March 19
| @ Indiana
| 
| Rodney Stuckey (25)
| Ben Gordon, Ben Wallace (7)
| Ben Gordon (6)
| Conseco Fieldhouse13,583
| 23-46
|-bgcolor="#ffcccc"
| 70
| March 21
| @ Cleveland
| 
| Jason Maxiell (16)
| Jason Maxiell (9)
| Will Bynum, Ben Gordon (5)
| Quicken Loans Arena20,562
| 23-47
|-bgcolor="#ffcccc"
| 71
| March 23
| Indiana
| 
| Tayshaun Prince (14)
| Kwame Brown (15)
| Tayshaun Prince (6)
| The Palace of Auburn Hills17,109
| 23-48
|-bgcolor="#ffcccc"
| 72
| March 26
| @ New Jersey
| 
| Tayshaun Prince (27)
| Jason Maxiell (11)
| Tayshaun Prince, Rodney Stuckey (7)
| Izod Center13,469
| 23-49
|-bgcolor="#ffcccc"
| 73
| March 28
| Chicago
| 
| Richard Hamilton (29)
| Jason Maxiell (10)
| Tayshaun Prince (6)
| The Palace of Auburn Hills22,076
| 23-50
|-bgcolor="#ffcccc"
| 74
| March 31
| Miami
| 
| Rodney Stuckey (18)
| Jonas Jerebko, Tayshaun Prince, Ben Wallace (6)
| Tayshaun Prince (6)
| The Palace of Auburn Hills22,076
| 23-51

|-bgcolor="#ffcccc"
| 75
| April 2
| Phoenix
| 
| Ben Gordon (21)
| Jonas Jerebko (10)
| Will Bynum (6)
| The Palace of Auburn Hills22,076
| 23-52
|-bgcolor="#ffcccc"
| 76
| April 3
| @ Atlanta
| 
| Rodney Stuckey (22)
| Jonas Jerebko (9)
| Ben Gordon, Tayshaun Prince (4)
| Philips Arena18729
| 23-53
|- bgcolor="#bbffbb"
| 77
| April 6
| @ Philadelphia
| 
| Charlie Villanueva (25)
| Austin Daye (9)
| Will Bynum (6)
| Wachovia Center13,832
| 24-53
|- bgcolor="#bbffbb"
| 78
| April 7
| Atlanta
| 
| Ben Gordon (22)
| Austin Daye (10)
| Ben Gordon (7)
| The Palace of Auburn Hills22,076
| 25-53
|- bgcolor="#bbffbb"
| 79
| April 9
| @ Miami
| 
| Ben Gordon (39)
| Jason Maxiell (7)
| Tayshaun Prince (5)
| American Airlines Arena19,600
| 26-53
|-bgcolor="#ffcccc"
| 80
| April 10
| @ Charlotte
| 
| Ben Gordon (21)
| Ben Wallace (10)
| Ben Gordon (7)
| Time Warner Cable Arena19,328
| 26-54
|-bgcolor="#ffcccc"
| 81
| April 12
| Toronto
| 
| Ben Gordon (24)
| Ben Gordon, Charlie Villanueva (6)
| Will Bynum (8)
| The Palace of Auburn Hills22,076
| 26-55
|- bgcolor="#bbffbb"
| 82
| April 14
| @ Minnesota
| 
| Tayshaun Prince (20)
| Jonas Jerebko (13)
| Chucky Atkins (5)
| Target Center15,790
| 27-55

Player statistics

Season 

|-
| 
| 40 || 11 || 16.1 || .363 || .301 || style=";"| .926 || .7 || 2.3 || .4 || .0 || 4.0
|-
| 
| 48 || 1 || 13.8 || .500 || .000 || .337 || 3.7 || .5 || .3 || .2 || 3.3
|-
| 
| 63 || 20 || 26.5 || .444 || .218 || .798 || 2.3 || 4.5 || .9 || .1 || 10.0
|-
| 
| 69 || 4 || 13.3 || .464 || .305 || .821 || 2.5 || .5 || .4 || .4 || 5.1
|-
| 
| 62 || 17 || 27.9 || .416 || .321 || .861 || 1.9 || 2.7 || .8 || .1 || 13.8
|-
| 
| 46 || 46 || 33.7 || .409 || .297 || .846 || 2.7 || 4.4|| .6 || .1 || style=";"| 18.1
|-
| 
| style=";"| 80 || style=";"| 73 || 27.9 || .481 || .313 || .710 || 6.0 || .7 || 1.0 || .4 || 9.3
|-
| 
| 76 || 29 || 20.4 || .511 || .000 || .574 || 5.3 || .5 || .5 || .5 || 6.8
|-
| 
| 49 || 49 || 34.0 || .486 || style=";"| .370 || .714 || 5.1 || 3.3 || .7 || .4 || 13.5
|-
| 
| 73 || 67 || style=";"| 34.2 || .405 || .228 || .833 || 3.8 || style=";"| 4.8 || style=";"| 1.4 || .2 || 16.6
|-
| 
| 44 || 0 || 9.2 || .354 || .357 || .711 || 1.0 || .4 || .2 || .2 || 3.0
|-
| 
| 78 || 16 || 23.7 || .439 || .351 || .815 || 4.7 || .7 || .6 || .7 || 11.9
|-
| 
| 69 || 67 || 28.6 || style=";"| .541 || .000 || .406 || style=";"| 8.7 || 1.5 || 1.2 || style=";"| 1.2 || 5.5
|-
| 
| 34 || 10 || 13.0 || .525 || .000 || .500 || 3.4 || .4 || .4 || .4 || 4.5
|}

Transactions

References 

Detroit Pistons seasons
Detroit
Detroit
Detroit